The 1907–08 St. Helens season was the club's thirteenth in the Northern Rugby Football Union, the 34th in their history. The club finished 25th out of 27 in the Championship, and bottom of the Lancashire League. In the Challenge Cup, the club were knocked out in the first round by Whitehaven.

NRFU Championship

References

St Helens R.F.C. seasons
St Helens RLFC season
St Helens RLFC season
1907 in English rugby league
1908 in English rugby league